Nothingface is a self-tilted demo by American alternative metal band Nothingface.  It is the first album with lead singer Matt Holt.

The album was originally released in 1995, but was reissued as a digital download on April 30, 2009, with remastering done by Drew Mazurek (producer for Hellyeah, Linkin Park, GWAR and others)

Track listing 

1995 original
 "Defaced"  3:15
 "Perfect Person"  4:23
 "Severed"  4:56
 "Useless"  3:51
 "Self Punishment"  4:54
 "Hitch"  5:50
 "Carousel"  4:05
 "Deprive"  3:12
 "Godkill"  4:06
 "Communion"  5:37

Personnel 
 Matt Holt – vocals
 Tom Maxwell – guitar
 Bill Gaal – bass
 Chris Houck – drums

References 

Nothingface albums
demo albums